Astolpho Junio Lopes (born March 11, 1983), or simply Lopes, is a Brazilian football goalkeeper, who plays for Icasa.

Honours
Rio de Janeiro's Cup: 2007

Contract
June 3, 2009, to November 30, 2009

External links 
 
  
  
 Lopes at GloboEsporte 
 

1983 births
Living people
Footballers from Rio de Janeiro (city)
Brazilian footballers
Bangu Atlético Clube players
Clube Atlético Juventus players
Botafogo de Futebol e Regatas players
Duque de Caxias Futebol Clube players
Itumbiara Esporte Clube players
Fortaleza Esporte Clube players
Ceará Sporting Club players
Clube do Remo players
Treze Futebol Clube players
ABC Futebol Clube players
Association football goalkeepers
People from Itaperuna